The City Bank Limited is a Bangladeshi private commercial bank headquartered in Dhaka.

The bank provides products and services in retail banking, corporate finance, SME Banking, women banking, digital banking, asset management, equity brokerage, and security. It has 132 branches. The bank is a licensee to issue Visa and MasterCard Debit and Credit Cards and it is the sole licensee of American Express Cards in Bangladesh. The bank is responsible for all operations supporting the issuing of the new credit cards, including billing and accounting, customer service, credit management, and charge authorizations, as well as marketing for American Express cards in Bangladesh.

The bank is a real-time online bank, having its branches, SME/Agri branches spread across Bangladesh along with a full-fledged Islami Banking branch.

The Managing Director & CEO of the bank is Mashrur Arefin.

History 
It is a first-generation private commercial bank and it is one of the oldest commercial banks in the country. Then known as "The City Bank Limited", its operations were started on 28 March 1983 by 12 local businessmen of the country. Those directors commenced the journey with only BDT 34 Million worth of Capital, which now is a respectable BDT 3.3 Billion as capital & reserve.
 The City Bank Limited opened its first branch in B. B. Avenue Branch in Dhaka. In 1986, The City Bank Limited was listed on the Dhaka Stock Exchange and in 1995 it was listed on Chittagong Stock Exchange.
City Bank has gone international establishing 10 branches and 1 representative office in Malaysia in 2013 and one subsidiary office in Hong Kong in 2019. International Finance Corporation solely has invested BDT 1.31 Billion, attaining a 5% share of City Bank.

On the 25th Anniversary in 2008, The City Bank Limited revamped its image and services. This includes the launch of a new logo, launched American Express credit cards, brokerage business, and City Wallet (SMS Banking) service. The name of the bank was simplified to "City Bank" from its earlier "The City Bank Limited". The new logo, depicting a red and white checkered box kite, was launched in July 2008.

Awards
The following awards were received by the bank:
 Best Bank in Bangladesh – 2018 FinanceAsia Country Awards for Achievement
 Best Investment Bank in Bangladesh – 2018 FinanceAsia Country Awards for Achievement
 Best Consumer Digital Bank in Bangladesh 2018 –  Global Finance
 Best Bank for Premium Services 2018 by Asiamoney

References

External links

 

Banks of Bangladesh with Islamic banking services